Andrea Anne Villanueva Del Rosario (born November 27, 1977) is a Filipino actress, beauty queen, model, and politician. She was a former member of the girl group Viva Hot Babes and the Batch 3 of Star Magic. She was a 4th Runner-up in Miss Philippines Earth 2001 winning a special award of Miss Close Up Killer Smile.

In 2006, she made her first television appearance as a series regular for the remake of the Primetime soap "Gulong Ng Palad" as Mimi Sandoval and "Sana Maulit Muli as Clara Espino-Soriano. Her role was very much praised as the arch type antagonist.

In 2016, Del Rosario entered politics as a candidate for vice mayor of Calatagan, Batangas, in the 2016 local elections on May 9, 2016. She later won, and proclaimed as the newly elected vice mayor, after the election.

Aside from politics and showbiz, Del Rosario ventured into food business as a co-owner of the Longganisa Sorpresa, a restaurant, which features dishes from longganisa.

Filmography

Television

Movies

External links
 
Pinoy Central Profile

References

Filipino actor-politicians
Nacionalista Party politicians
People from Batangas
Filipino film actresses
Filipino television actresses
Living people
Miss Philippines Earth contestants
Filipino female models
del Rosario
1977 births
Filipino restaurateurs
Politicians from Batangas